Hvide Sande is a small town in the middle of the Holmsland Dunes and placed around the artificial canal which connects Ringkøbing Fjord to the North Sea, in the western part of Central Denmark Region, formerly (until 1 January 2007) Ringkjøbing County, Denmark.
The town has a population of 2,874 (1 January 2022) and is the fifth largest fishing port in Denmark.

Geography 
The town has, despite its size and placement on the absolute outskirts of Denmark, developed into a very active center for various businesses, first and foremost tourism, fishery, shipyards and more, as well as a harbour for offshore supply boats and services.

Tourism 
Tourism is a major contributor to the local economy. Especially German, Danish, Scandinavian and Dutch tourists visit the town and the Holmsland Dunes. They come to the area first and foremost for the quiet and peace along with the possibility to perform a number of outdoor activities in a climate suitable for an active outdoor life. Biking, fishing, wandering and various boardsports are available from a number of vendors.

The town's biggest employer is Hvide Sande Shipyard, Steel and Service (former Hvide Sande Skibs- & Baadebyggeri) where they build special purpose vessels, crew transfer vessels for the offshore sector and ferries. Vestvaerftet is another shipyard whose specialty is the building of all kinds of fishing vessels.

In 2013 the port of Hvide Sande took a big step towards becoming a supply and support harbour for the offshore industry in the North Sea when the new 800 m long pier south of the harbour was finished thus making it possible for much larger ships to enter the port. In 2016 a new quay was finished in the south part of the outer harbour to accommodate an increased demand from both offshore vessels and freight ships.

As of July 2016, MHI Vestas Offshore Wind chose the port of Hvide Sande as commissioning harbour for the operation of erecting wind turbines at the Horns rev 3 site 33 km south west of Hvide Sande. MHI Vestas will establish offices for up to 40 persons at the harbour in Hvide Sande.

Notable people 
 Henrik Have (1946 — 2014 in Hvide Sande) a Danish author and artist
 Anne Lise Kjaer (born 1962) a London-based futurist and keynote speaker, brought up in Hvide Sande

See also
North Sea Beach Marathon

References

External links

Hvide Sande city website
Hvide Sande Shipyard, Steel and Service
Vestværftet
MHI Vestas Offshore Wind
Weather forecast Hvide Sande, Denmark Weather-atlas.com

Cities and towns in the Central Denmark Region
Ringkøbing-Skjern Municipality
Port cities and towns of the North Sea